1980 in philosophy

Events 
 November 16 - Louis Althusser strangles his wife, Hélène Rytman, to death, following a period of mental instability.

Publications 
 David Bohm, Wholeness and the Implicate Order
 Ronna Burger, Plato's Phaedrus: A Defense of a Philosophic Art of Writing
 Donald Davidson, Essays on Actions and Events
 Umberto Eco, The Name of the Rose
 Peter Geach and Max Black, Translations from the Philosophical Writings of Gottlob Frege
 Saul Kripke, Naming and Necessity
 George Lakoff and Mark Johnson, Metaphors We Live By
 Jeremy Rifkin and Ted Howard, Entropy: A New World View (with an afterword by Nicholas Georgescu-Roegen)
 John Searle, "Minds, Brains, and Programs"

Births 
 October 2 - Henry Bugalho

Deaths 
 March 18 - Erich Fromm (born 1900)
 March 26 - Roland Barthes (born 1915)
 April 9 - Muhammad Baqir al-Sadr, executed (born 1935)
 April 15 - Jean-Paul Sartre (born 1905)
 July 1 - C. P. Snow (born 1905)
 July 4 - Gregory Bateson (born 1904)
 August 10 - Gareth Evans (born 1946)
 September 4 - Walter Kaufmann (born 1921)
 September 16 - Jean Piaget (born 1896)
 December 31 - Marshall McLuhan (born 1911)

References 

Philosophy
20th-century philosophy
Philosophy by year